Thorium oxalate is the inorganic compound with the formula Th(C2O4)2(H2O)4.  It is a white insoluble solid prepared by the reaction of thorium(IV) salts with an oxalic acid.  The material is a coordination polymer. Each Th(IV) center is bound to 10 oxygen centers: eight provided by the bridging oxalates and two by a pair of aquo ligands.  Two additional water of hydration are observed in the lattice.

The solubility product (Ksp) of thorium oxalate is 5.0110−25.
Density of anhydrous thorium oxalate is 4.637 g/cm3.

References

External links
 Atomistry.com: Thorium oxalate info page
 International Bio-Analytical Industries: Thorium Oxalate Dihydrate

Thorium compounds
Oxalates